WANI (1400 AM, "News Talk WANI") is a news/talk radio station in Auburn, Alabama. The station is owned by Auburn Network, Inc. and serves the Auburn, Alabama, radio market.

The station was assigned the WANI call letters by the Federal Communications Commission on December 1, 1997.

Programming
The station carries syndicated national radio talk shows including "The Rush Limbaugh Show", "The Sean Hannity Show", "The Dave Ramsey Show", "Glenn Beck Program", and other national news/talk programs. Local programming includes a morning news program called "Auburn/Opelika This Morning with Bob Wooddy" and a weekly news recap show called "Auburn/Opelika This Week with Chuck Wacker".

WANI simulcasts all of its broadcasting on W254AY 98.7 FM via WGZZ-HD2.

References

External links
WANI official website

ANI
News and talk radio stations in the United States
Radio stations established in 1940
1940 establishments in Alabama